Verona Beach is a hamlet in Oneida County, New York, United States. The community is located along the eastern shore of Oneida Lake and New York State Route 13; the Erie Canal separates the community from neighboring Sylvan Beach. Verona Beach has a post office with ZIP code 13162. Verona Beach State Park is located in the community.

References

Hamlets in Oneida County, New York
Hamlets in New York (state)